Zalongo is a former municipality in the Preveza regional unit, Epirus, Greece. Since the 2011 local government reform it is part of the municipality Preveza, of which it is a municipal unit. The municipal unit has an area of 137.631 km2. Population 4,299 (2011). The seat of the municipality was in Kanali. Nearby is the 18th century Zalongo Monastery, immortalized by the defiant mass suicide of a group of Souliot women. The ruins of ancient Cassope are situated near the village Kamarina.

References

Populated places in Preveza (regional unit)